The Federal Correctional Institution, Forrest City (FCI Forrest City) is a United States federal prison for male inmates in Arkansas.  It is part of the Forrest City Federal Correctional Complex (FCC Forrest City) and is operated by the Federal Bureau of Prisons, a division of the United States Department of Justice.  FCC Forrest City is located in eastern Arkansas, 85 miles east of Little Rock and 45 miles west of Memphis, Tennessee.

The complex consists of four facilities:

 Federal Correctional Institution, Forrest City Low (FCI Forrest City Low): a low-security facility.
 Federal Correctional Institution, Forrest City Medium (FCI Forrest City Medium): a medium-security facility
 A satellite prison camp adjacent to the facility houses minimum-security male offenders.

The facility is named for the town of Forrest City, Arkansas, itself named for Confederate General Nathan Bedford Forrest.

Facility and programs
FCI Forrest City opened in April 1997. Inmates are housed in dormitories with cubicles. Educational opportunities include GED, ESL, continuing education and parenting courses. Career counseling and vocational training are also available, as well as a drug treatment program. A federal industries program, known as UNICOR, employs 300 inmates and produces a furniture line called "Harmony." All inmates at FCI Forrest City are required to perform a job assignment, including cleaning services, clerical duties, masonry, plumbing, painting, landscaping and welding.

In media
On October 10, 2013, FoxNews.com reported on how the United States federal government shutdown of 2013 was affecting employees at FCI Forrest City. Citing a story from WMC-TV, prison employees were unsure when the next time they would receive a paycheck amid the shutdown, but the inmates are continuing to get paid for jobs like landscaping. The report said that the inmates are still receiving checks because their funds come out of a trust fund that is not affected by the problems in Washington. About 600 workers at FCI Forrest City are impacted by the slimdown, the report said. "The inmates who have committed the crimes in this country and are incarcerated by violating the laws of common society, they’re not affected by the shutdown, but the employees that we trust to keep our communities safe are," Jeff Roberts, a prison employee who goes to work every day and does not get paid, told the station. Roberts added that there was concern among employees that they would be unable to pay bills.

Notable inmates (current and former)

See also

 List of U.S. federal prisons
 Federal Bureau of Prisons
 Incarceration in the United States

References

External links
 FCI Forrest City—low security official website
 FCI Forrest City—medium security official website

1997 establishments in Arkansas
Buildings and structures completed in 1997
Buildings and structures in St. Francis County, Arkansas
Federal Correctional Institutions in the United States
Forrest City, Arkansas
Prisons in Arkansas